Styphelia propinqua is a small  shrub in the family Ericaceae native to Western Australia. It was first described as Leucopogon propinquus in 1810 by Robert Brown, then transferred to genus Styphelia in 1824 by Kurt Polycarp Joachim Sprengel.

References 

propinqua
Ericales of Australia
Flora of Western Australia
Taxa named by Kurt Polycarp Joachim Sprengel
Plants described in 1824